Chirpy Burpy Cheap Sheep is the second episode of the third series of the Channel 4 sitcom Father Ted.

Synopsis
Ted bets the entire year's heating allowance for the parochial house on the King of the Sheep competition, placing his bet on Chris, a sheep who has won several times and is considered a sure thing. Unfortunately, Chris has heard rumours about a sheep-eating beast and is not feeling at all himself. With a very cold winter forecast for the year, Ted becomes very worried about the possibility of losing the bet. He goes to John and Mary, asking for his bet money back, but they refuse.

Chris's owner, Fargo Boyle, comes to the parochial house and begs Ted to help return Chris to his old self. After a week, Ted has successfully returned Chris's spirit. However, after he and Dougal hear sounds in the night and, upon investigation, discover a stereo in a tree, Ted finds out that Boyle arranged for Chris to be frightened by the beast (thanks to an album of BBC Sound Effects) in order to increase the meagre odds being offered for his victory.

On the day of the competition, just as Chris is about to be declared the winner, Ted makes a dramatic scene and exposes the whole plot, telling the judge his observations, including expensive items being worn by the other contestants (after Fargo paid them to spread rumours about the beast) and Fargo leaving a shop with a BBC Sound Effects record that Dougal had wanted to buy - the judge is appalled to hear about this plot, and Chris is instantly disqualified. Fargo begs Chris's forgiveness, but the sheep is apparently unforgiving.

Although Ted makes a dramatic exit, he is left kicking himself when Dougal points out that because Chris was disqualified, he has lost the bet, and thus all of the heating allowance money - subsequently, the residents of the parochial house prepare themselves to hibernate for the extremely cold winter that is soon due.

The Beast of Craggy Island
Ted and Dougal proved that the "Beast" was a hoax created by Giant Reed and Hud Hastings to rig the "King of the Sheep" competition.

Dougal, Mrs. Doyle and Hud all give a description of the Beast: 
 It has claws as big as cups (Dougal)
 It has four ears, two for listening and two "are sort of back-up ears". Some might be on the inside of its head (Dougal)
 It has a retractable leg so it "can leap up at you better" (Dougal)
 It has magnets on its tail, so "if you're made out of metal, it can attach itself to you" (Dougal)
 It lights up at night (Dougal)
 It has a tremendous fear of stamps (Dougal)
 Its yawn sounds like Liam Neeson chasing a load of hens around inside a barrel (Dougal)
 It has no mouth, but instead has four arses (Dougal)
 It only has eyebrows on Saturdays (Dougal)
 It lives "on the place where there should be moors" (Mrs. Doyle)
 It makes a "terrible howling noise" (Mrs. Doyle)
 It is the size of a jaguar [the cat not the car] (Hud)
 It has big white teeth, as sharp as knives (Hud)

The "terrible howling noise" was due to a stereo placed in a tree by Giant and Hud to trick the locals into believing in the existence of the "Beast". The "Beast"'s other features were just rumours spread by Giant and Hud.

Trivia

 This episode shows that Dougal is forced by Ted to keep a list of things (named, appropriately enough, 'They Don't Exist') that don't exist, which lists the following:
 Loch Ness Monster
 Frankenstein 
 Magnum, P.I.
 Non-Catholic Gods
 Darth Vader
 The Phantom of the Opera
 The Beast of Craggy Island
 This episode is notable as being the only episode in the entire series to contain the word 'fucking' spoken uncensored (it is heard twice, when "fuckin' hell" is exclaimed off-camera by Graham Linehan while others express shock at Ted's revelations about the Beast). In other episodes, minced oaths such as "feck" are used instead.
 This episode inspired Australian Sue Dowling in September 2015 to give the name "Chris" to a sheep she spotted in a paddock in Canberra that had an unusually large fleece. The fleece was shorn and set a world record for the heaviest fleece.
 The title for this episode is a play on words of the title of the 1971 song "Chirpy Chirpy Cheep Cheep", made famous by Middle of the Road.

Notes

External links

References

Father Ted episodes
1998 British television episodes